Jet Reaction is a motorcycle built by British motorcycle land-speed record challenger Richard Brown. The motorcycle is powered by a turboshaft helicopter engine converted to afterburning turbojet.

He expects to exceed  with Jet Reaction in 2012–2013. If successful, it will be the first jet-propelled motorcycle record breaker.

Notes

References

External links

Motorcycles of the United Kingdom
Land speed record motorcycles